Hang On to a Dream: The Verve Recordings is a compilation album by folk artist Tim Hardin, released in 1994. It includes all Hardin's studio recordings for the Verve label as well as alternate takes, unreleased tracks, and demos.

The songs include all tracks from the albums Tim Hardin 1, Tim Hardin 2 and Tim Hardin 4 (last track not included), the latter a release of demos done by Hardin for Columbia in 1964 which were ultimately rejected at that time.

Reception

Writing for Allmusic, music critic Richie Unterberger's review referred to Hardin's "expressive, blues-inflected vocals and confessional songwriting..." In his review for No Depression, critic John Morthland wrote "The pain was palpable in nearly every word Tim Hardin sang, and the pleasure didn't feel all that much better... That said, Hardin can be hard to take for long — junkie self-pity, which eventually gets tedious, was never far from even his greatest efforts — and two full discs (including demos) is likely too much of a good thing. But everybody should hear at least some Hardin..."

Track listing 
All songs by Tim Hardin unless otherwise noted.

Disc one 
 "Don't Make Promises" – 2:23
 "Green Rocky Road" – 2:16
 "Smugglin' Man" – 1:54
 "How Long" – 4:33
 "While You're on Your Way" – 2:14
 "It'll Never Happen Again" – 2:34
 "Reason to Believe" – 1:57
 "Never Too Far" – 2:12
 "Part of the Wind" – 2:15
 "Ain't Gonna Do Without" – 3:40
 "Misty Roses" – 1:57
 "How Can We Hang On to a Dream?" – 2:01
 "If I Were a Carpenter" – 2:40
 "Red Balloon" – 2:32
 "Black Sheep Boy" – 1:53
 "The Lady Came from Baltimore" – 1:48
 "Baby Close Its Eyes" – 1:51
 "You Upset the Grace of Living When You Lie" – 1:45
 "Speak Like a Child" – 3:13
 "See Where You Are and Get Out" – 1:10
 "It's Hard to Believe in Love for Long" – 2:15
 "Tribute to Hank Williams" – 3:08
 "While You're on Your Way" (alternate take) – 2:34
 "It'll Never Happen Again" (alternate take) – 2:06

Disc two 
 "Airmobile" – 2:19
 "Whiskey, Whiskey" – 5:39
 "Seventh Son" (Willie Dixon) – 2:05
 "Danville Dame" – 2:46
 "House of the Rising Sun" (Traditional) – 3:39
 "Bo Diddley (McDaniel)	 2:52
 "I Can't Slow Down" – 2:28
 "Hello Baby" – 5:20
 "Rolling Stone" (Muddy Waters) – 2:38
 "You Got a Reputation" – 2:26
 "Keep Your Hands Off Her" (Traditional) – 3:00
 "Nobody Knows You When You're Down and Out" (Jimmy Cox) – 4:03
 "(I'm Your) Hoochie Coochie Man" (Dixon) – 5:02
 "So Glad You're Mine" (Arthur Crudup) – 4:02
 "You Can't Judge a Book" (Dixon) – 3:13
 "She Ain't Home" – 2:17
 "You Say You Love Me" – 2:10
 "How Time Flies" – 3:45
 "You Can Ruin a Man" – 2:31
 "If I Knew" – 2:41
 "She's Up to Something New" – 4:04
 "Who'll Be the Man" (Traditional) – 2:01
 "First Love Song" – 3:54

Personnel
Tim Hardin – vocals, guitar, piano
Gary Burton – vibraphone
Bob Bushnell – bass
Phil Kraus – vibraphone
Earl Palmer – drums
Felix Pappalardi – bass
Walter Yost – bass
Buddy Saltzman – drums
Sticks Evans – drums
John Sebastian – harmonica
Production notes:
Erik Jacobsen – producer
Don Rubin – producer
Charles Koppelman – producer
Artie Butler – string arrangements
Lisa Law – photography
David Gahr – photography
Bill Levenson – executive producer
Dan Loggins – associate producer
Jerry Rappaport – compilation producer
Terri Tierney – coordination
Colin Escott – liner notes

References

External links 
Browne, David. Tim Hardin Defied Convention. 1994. NY Times

Tim Hardin albums
1994 compilation albums
Albums produced by Erik Jacobsen
Albums produced by Charles Koppelman
Polydor Records compilation albums